Sheila Therese Jack Babauta (born ) is a Northern Mariana Islands politician and is a member of the Northern Mariana Islands House of Representatives, representing District 4 for the Democratic Party.

Early life
Babauta was born and grew up on the island of Saipan, on the edge of the Mariana Trench. In 2005 she travelled to the Washington, D.C. on a scholarship from the Close Up Foundation.

Career
Babauta was elected to the Northern Mariana Islands House of Representatives, representing District 4 for the Democratic Party, in 2019. She was re-elected for a term to 2023, in the 2020 general election. 

In November 2021, she described her plans to attend the 2021 United Nations Climate Change Conference (COP 26) in Glasgow, Scotland, although the journey would be "no easy feat. Crossing the Pacific Ocean, the entire North American continent, and the Atlantic Ocean, brings me a long way from our warm island home". She said that "my brothers and sisters across the Pacific hold the keys to solve the problem of militarization, climate change, and climate colonialism. We are not passive victims. We hold solutions that are grounded in our millennia of living as kin to the land and ocean." At the conference she introduced former United States President Barack Obama when he addressed the conference, saying that he was a "son of the Asia Pacific" who "recognizes that communities impacted by climate change must have a seat at the table to ensure accountability and action from all parties who contribute major carbon emissions". 

Babauta is chair of the Friends of the Mariana Trench Marine National Monument, a body which works to protect the Marianas Trench Marine National Monument centred on the Mariana Trench.

References

Year of birth missing (living people)
Living people
People from Saipan
Members of the Northern Mariana Islands House of Representatives
Northern Mariana Islands women in politics